Stade Laione Rugby is a 1,000-capacity stadium in Mata-Utu, Wallis Island, Wallis and Futuna.

References

Sports venues in Wallis and Futuna